Burlington is an unincorporated community and census-designated place in Milam County, Texas, United States. It was first listed as a CDP in the 2020 census with a population of 81. Burlington has a post office with the postal ("ZIP") code 76519.

History
The earliest settlers in the area included John and Michael Jones. The pair built cabins in the area c1867, with the community initially being named Irish Settlement. A Catholic Church was constructed in the 1880s. When the post office was established in 1884, the town was renamed Waterford. The post office was operated in the home of Timothy Gleason, a native of Tipperary, Ireland, who changed the towns name to Burlington, after Burlington, Vermont.

Climate
The climate in this area is characterized by hot, humid summers and generally mild to cool winters.  According to the Köppen Climate Classification system, Burlington has a humid subtropical climate, abbreviated "Cfa" on climate maps.

References

Census-designated places in Milam County, Texas
Census-designated places in Texas
Unincorporated communities in Milam County, Texas
Unincorporated communities in Texas